The men's hammer throw event at the 1999 European Athletics U23 Championships was held in Göteborg, Sweden, at Ullevi on 29 and 30 July 1999.

Medalists

Results

Final
30 July

Qualifications
29 July
Qualifying 72.00 or 12 best to the Final

Group A

Group B

Participation
According to an unofficial count, 23 athletes from 16 countries participated in the event.

 (1)
 (1)
 (1)
 (1)
 (3)
 (3)
 (2)
 (1)
 (1)
 (2)
 (2)
 (1)
 (1)
 (1)
 (1)
 (1)

References

Hammer throw
Hammer throw at the European Athletics U23 Championships